The Tschiener House, also known as the Dumas School,  was a historic residence in Mobile, Alabama, United States.  The Carpenter Gothic structure was built in 1866. It was placed on the National Register of Historic Places on January 18, 1982. It was later destroyed by fire. One former outbuilding remains at the site.

References

National Register of Historic Places in Mobile, Alabama
Houses in Mobile, Alabama
Carpenter Gothic architecture in Alabama
Houses completed in 1866
Demolished buildings and structures in Alabama
Carpenter Gothic houses in the United States
1866 establishments in Alabama